The 2017 Miami Marlins season was the 25th season for the Major League Baseball (MLB) Marlins franchise, all in the National League, and the sixth as the "Miami" Marlins. The Marlins played their home games at Marlins Park and hosted the 2017 MLB All-Star Game. The Marlins were managed by Don Mattingly in his second season as manager of the team. They finished the season 77–85 to finish in second place, 20 games behind the Washington Nationals, in the National League East Division. They failed to make the playoffs for the 14th consecutive season.

The season marked the last season under Jeffrey Loria's ownership of the team as Loria agreed to sell the team to a group led by Derek Jeter for $1.2 billion.

Regular season
On June 3, Edinson Vólquez threw his first career no-hitter and the sixth in Marlins history, defeating the Arizona Diamondbacks, 3–0, at Marlins Park. Vólquez threw 98 pitches, struck out 10 and walked two batters (both of whom were both erased on double plays), facing the minimum number of batters.  On June 14, outfielder Ichiro Suzuki singled for his 365th interleague hit, passing Derek Jeter to becoming the all-time leader in interleague hits.

On June 25, Ichiro became the oldest player to start a game in center field since at least 1900, breaking the record previously held by Rickey Henderson.  Ichiro singled twice on July 6 against the St. Louis Cardinals, bringing his hits total to 3,054 and surpassing Panamanian-born Rod Carew as the all-time leader in MLB hits among foreign-born players.

The Marlins hosted the 2017 MLB All-Star Game at Marlins Park.  Right fielder Giancarlo Stanton (fourth time) and left fielder Marcell Ozuna (second) were selected to the National League team.  At the time, Stanton led the NL with 26 home runs and batted .277/.360/.572.

The Marlins' 22–10 win over the Texas Rangers on July 26 set a new franchise record for the most runs scored in a single game.

While playing the San Francisco Giants on August 14, Stanton hit his 43rd home run, setting the Marlins franchise record for most home runs in a season, which passed Gary Sheffield's mark of 42 set in 1996.  Stanton hit the home run versus Ty Blach and had homered in five consecutive games, setting another franchise record.  In a duration of 35 games through August 15, Stanton advanced in a historic run, producing 23 home runs, including in six games in a row.  Only Sammy Sosa (1998) and Barry Bonds (2001) had ever hit more in a 35-game span.

On August 26, Ichiro set the Marlins' single-season franchise record for pinch-hits with his 22nd pinch hit.  On August 27, Stanton became the first player since Chris Davis in 2013 to hit 50 home runs in one season.  Stanton also became the sixth player in history to reach 50 home runs before the end of August.  In the August 29 game versus the Washington Nationals, he hit his 18th home run of the month, tying Rudy York for his record of home runs in August set in 1937.

Stanton won the NL Player of the Month Award for August, leading the major leagues with 18 home runs, 37 RBI, 28 runs scored and .899 slugging percentage.

On September 8, Ichiro became the sixth player all-time to hit 2,500 career singles, as well as the eighth right fielder of all-time to record over 4,000 putouts at the position.  Stanton hit his 57th home run and drove in four runs on September 23 versus Arizona, giving him 125 on the season, and passing Preston Wilson's franchise record of 121 set in 2000.  In spite of Stanton's historic season, ESPN ranked Marlins Park as one of the six most difficult stadiums in which to hit a home run in 2017.

Season standings

National League East

National League Wild Card

Record vs. opponents

Game log 

|- style=background:#fbb;
|1||April 3||@ Nationals|| 2–4 || Strasburg (1–0) || Phelps (0–1) || Treinen (1) || 42,744 || 0–1 || L1
|- style=background:#fbb;
|2||April 5||@ Nationals|| 4–6 || Roark (1–0) || Straily (0–1) || Treinen (2) || 22,715 || 0–2 || L2
|- style=background:#bfb;
|3||April 6||@ Nationals|| 4–3 (10) || Phelps (1–1) || Blanton (0–1) || Ramos (1) || 19,418 || 1–2  || W1
|-style=background:#bfb;
|4||April 7||@ Mets|| 7–2 || Chen (1–0) || Wheeler (0–1) ||—|| 27,891 || 2–2 || W2
|-style=background:#bfb;
|5||April 8||@ Mets|| 8–1 || Conley (1–0) || Gsellman (0–1) ||—|| 33,936 || 3–2 || W3
|-style=background:#fbb;
|6||April 9||@ Mets|| 2–5 || Syndergaard (1–0) ||  Vólquez (0–1) ||Reed (1) || 27,420 || 3–3 || L1
|-style=background:#bfb;
|7||April 11||Braves|| 8–4 ||Straily (1–1)  || Colón (0–1) ||—|| 36,519  || 4–3 || W1
|-style=background:#fbb;
|8||April 12||Braves|| 4–5 || Vizcaíno (1–0) || Ramos (0–1) || Johnson (1) || 16,808 || 4–4 || L1
|-style=background:#fbb;
|9||April 13||Mets|| 8–9 (16) || Robles (2–0) ||Conley (1–1) ||—|| 23,192 || 4–5 || L2
|-style=background:#bfb;
|10||April 14||Mets|| 3–2 || Ramos (1–1) || Edgin (0–1) ||—|| 24,194 || 5–5 || W1
|-style=background:#bfb;
|11||April 15||Mets|| 5–4|| Tazawa (1–0)|| Salas (0–1)||Ramos (2)|| 25,137 || 6–5 ||W2
|-style=background:#bfb;
|12||April 16||Mets|| 4–2 || Phelps (2–1) || Reed (0–1) ||—|| 20,058 || 7–5 ||W3
|-style=background:#fbb;
|13||April 17||@ Mariners|| 1–6 || Miranda (1–1) || Koehler (0–1) ||—|| 16,990 || 7–6 ||L1
|-style=background:#bfb;
|14||April 18||@ Mariners|| 5–0 || Chen (2–0) || Gallardo (0–2) ||—|| 16,126 || 8–6 ||W1
|-style=background:#fbb;
|15||April 19||@ Mariners|| 5–10 || Hernandez (2–1) || Volquez (0–1)||—|| 27,147 || 8–7 ||L1
|-style=background:#fbb;
|16||April 21||@ Padres|| 3–5 || Cahill (1–2) || Phelps (2–2) ||—|| 30,413 || 8-8 ||L2
|-style=background:#bfb;
|17||April 22||@ Padres|| 6–3 (11)|| Ziegler (1–0) || Torres (1–1) || Ramos (3)|| 39,313 || 9-8 ||W1
|-style=background:#bfb;
|18||April 23||@ Padres|| 7–3 || Koehler (1-1) || Stammen (0-1) ||—|| 26,070 || 10-8 ||W2
|- style="background:#bbb"
| – || April 25 || @ Phillies || colspan=7 | Postponed (rain); Rescheduled for August 22 as part of a doubleheader.
|-style=background:#fbb;
|19||April 26||@ Phillies || 4–7 || Velasquez (1–2) || Chen (2–1) || — || 26,191 || 10–9 || L1
|-style=background:#fbb;
|20||April 27||@ Phillies|| 2–3 || Hellickson (4–0) || Vólquez (0–3) || Neris (3) || 22,180 || 10–10 || L2
|-style=background:#fbb;
|21||April 28||Pirates|| 2–12 || Tallion (2-0) || Conley (1-2) ||—|| 19,690 || 10–11 || L3
|-style=background:#fbb;
|22||April 29||Pirates|| 0–4 || Nova (3–2) || Straily (1–2)|| — || 33,619 || 10–12 || L4
|-style=background:#bfb;
|23||April 30||Pirates|| 10–3 || McGowan (1–0) || Williams (1–1) || — || 26,245 || 11-12 || W1
|-

|-style=background:#fbb;
| 24 || May 1 || Rays || 2–4 || Farquhar (1–1) || Ziegler (1–1) || Colomé (6)|| 16,096 || 11–13 || L1
|-style=background:#fbb;
| 25 || May 2 || Rays || 1–3 || Cobb (2–2) || Vólquez (0–4) || Colomé (7)|| 16,011 || 11–14 || L2
|-style=background:#bfb;
| 26 || May 3 || @ Rays || 10–5 || Conley (2–2) || Pruitt (3–1)  || — || 12,285 || 12–14 || W1
|-style=background:#fbb;
| 27 || May 4 || @ Rays || 1–5 || Andriese (2–1)  || Straily (1–3) || — || 10,118 || 12–15 ||L1
|-style=background:#fbb;
| 28 || May 5 ||@ Mets || 7–8 || Blevins (2–0)  || Ziegler (1–2) || Familia (3) || 25,618 || 12–16 || L2
|-style=background:#fbb;
| 29 || May 6 ||@ Mets || 3–11 || Gsellman (2–2) || Despaigne (0–1)  || — || 33,339 || 12–17 || L3
|-style=background:#bfb;
| 30 || May 7 ||@ Mets || 7–0 || Ureña (1–0) || Wilk (0–1)  || — || 39,197 || 13–17 || W1
|-style=background:#fbb;
| 31 || May 8 ||Cardinals || 4–9 || Martinez (2–3) || Conley (2–3) || Socolovich (1) || 16,750 || 13–18 || L1
|-style=background:#fbb;
| 32 || May 9 ||Cardinals || 5–6 || Rosenthal (1–1) || Ramos (1–2) || Oh (8) || 17,166 || 13–19 || L2
|-style=background:#fbb;
| 33 || May 10 ||Cardinals || 5–7 || Tuivailala (2–0) || Garcia (0–1) || Oh (9) || 18,614|| 13–20 || L3
|-style=background:#fbb;
| 34 || May 12 ||Braves || 4–8 || Foltynewicz (1–4) || Ureña (1–1)  || — || 20,052 || 13–21 || L4
|- style=background:#fbb;
| 35 || May 13 || Braves|| 1–3 || Teherán (3–3) || Vólquez (0–5)  || Johnson (6) || 26,692 || 13–22 || L5
|-style=background:#bfb;
| 36 || May 14 || Braves|| 3–1 || Barraclough (1–0) || Dickey (3–3)  || Ramos (4) || 17,277 || 14–22 || W1
|- style=background:#fbb;
| 37 || May 15 || Astros || 2–7 || Musgrove (3–3) || Tazawa (1–1)  || — || 16,448 || 14–23 || L1
|- style=background:#fbb;
| 38 || May 16 || Astros || 2–12 || Keuchel (7–0) || Koehler (1–2)  || — || 18,056 || 14–24 || L2
|- style=background:#fbb;
| 39 || May 17 || Astros || 0–3 || McCullers Jr (4–1) || Ureña (1–2) || Giles (11) || 24,669 || 14–25 || L3
|- bgcolor=
|- style=background:#fbb;
| 40 || May 18 || @ Dodgers || 2–7 || Ryu (2–5) || Vólquez (0–6) || Jansen (8) || 41,717 || 14–26 || L4
|-style=background:#fbb;
| 41 || May 19 || @ Dodgers || 2–7 || Wood (5–0) || Nicolino (0–1) || — || 45,034 || 14–27 || L5
|-style=background:#bfb;
| 42 || May 20 || @ Dodgers || 10–6 || Straily (2–3) || Urias (0–2)  || — ||52,850 || 15–27 || W1
|-style=background:#fbb;
| 43 || May 21 || @ Dodgers || 3–6 || McCarthy (4–1)  || Worley (0–1)|| — || 44,646 || 15–28 || L1
|-style=background:#bfb;
| 44 || May 23 || @ Athletics || 11–9 || Ureña (2–2) || Hahn (1–4) || — || 12,835 || 16–28 || W1
|-style=background:#fbb;
| 45 || May 24 || @ Athletics || 1–4 || Gray (2–1) || Vólquez (0–7) || Casilla (7) || 19,738 || 16–29 || L1
|-style=background:#bfb;
| 46 || May 26 || Angels || 8–5 || Straily (3–3) || Chavez (4–6) || Ramos (5) || 18,341 || 17–29 || W1
|-style=background:#fbb;
| 47 || May 27 || Angels || 2–5 || Ramirez (5–2) || Worley (0–2) || — || 19,366 || 17–30 || L1
|-style=background:#bfb;
| 48 || May 28 || Angels || 9–2 || Ureña (3–2) || Shoemaker (4–3) || — || 20,044 || 18–30 || W1
|-style=background:#bfb;
| 49 || May 29 || Phillies || 4–1 || Vólquez (1–7) || Hellickson (5–3) || Ramos (6) || 17,032 || 19–30 || W2
|-style=background:#bfb;
| 50 || May 30 || Phillies || 7–2 || McGowan (2–0) || Velasquez (2–5) || — || 16,341 || 20–30 || W3 
|-style=background:#bfb;
| 51 || May 31 || Phillies || 10–2 || Straily (4–3) || Nola (2–3) || — || 15,197|| 21–30 || W4
|-

|-style=background:#fbb;
| 52 || June 1 || D-Backs || 2–3 || Greinke (7–3)|| Barraclough (1–1) ||| Rodney (14) || 16,433 || 21–31 || L1 
|-style=background:#bfb;
| 53 || June 2 || D-Backs || 7–5 || McGowan (3–0) || Corbin (4–6) || Ramos (7) || 17,413 || 22–31 || W1
|-style=background:#bfb;
| 54 || June 3 || D-Backs || 3–0 || Vólquez (2–7) || Delgado (1–1) || — || 21,548 || 23–31 || W2
|-style=background:#bfb;
| 55 || June 4 || D-Backs || 6–5 || Wittgren (1–0)  || De La Rosa (2–1) || Ramos (8) || 20,387 || 24–31 || W3 
|-style=background:#fbb;
| 56 || June 5 ||@ Cubs || 1–3 || Butler (3–1) || Straily (4–4) || Montgomery (2) || 34,037 || 24–32 || L1 
|-style=background:#fbb;
| 57 || June 6 ||@ Cubs || 2–10 || Arrieta (6–4) || Locke (0–1) || — || 34,082  || 24–33 || L2 
|-style=background:#bfb;
| 58 || June 7 ||@ Cubs || 6–5 || Ureña (4–2) || Lackey (4–6) || Ramos (9) || 37,294 || 25–33 || W1 
|-style=background:#bfb;
| 59 || June 8 ||@ Pirates || 7–1 || Vólquez (3–7) || Cole (3–6) || — ||21,744  || 26–33 || W2 
|-style=background:#bfb;
| 60 || June 9 ||@ Pirates || 12–7 || McGowan (4–0) || Glansow (2–6) || — || 23,950 || 27–33 || W3 
|-style=background:#fbb;
| 61 || June 10 ||@ Pirates || 6–7 || Hudson (1–2) || Phelps (2–3) || Rivero (1) || 27,275 || 27–34 || L1 
|-style=background:#fbb;
| 62 || June 11 ||@ Pirates || 1–3 || Nova (6–4) || Locke (0–2) || Rivero (2) || 22,925 || 27–35 || L2 
|-style=background:#bfb; 
| 63 || June 13 || Athletics || 8–1 || Ureña (5–2) || Cotton (3–7) || — || 19,953 || 28–35 || W1
|- style=background:#bfb;
| 64 || June 14 || Athletics || 11–6 || Barraclough (2-1) || Gossett (0–1) || — || 19,436 || 29–35 || W2
|- style=background:#bfb;
| 65 || June 16 ||@ Braves || 5–0 || Straily (5–4) || Newcomb (0–2) || — || 38,123 || 30–35 || W3 
|-style=background:#fbb;
| 66 || June 17 ||@ Braves || 7–8 (10) || Vizcaino (3–2) || Ramos (1–3) || — || 38,661  || 30–36 || L1
|-style=background:#fbb;
| 67 || June 18 ||@ Braves || 4–5 || Johnson (5–1) || Steckenrider (0–1) || — || 36,912 || 30–37 || L2
|-style=background:#bfb;
| 68 || June 19 || Nationals || 8–7 || Ramos (2–3) || Romero (2–3) || — || 20,224 || 31–37 || W1 
|-style=background:#fbb;
| 69 || June 20 || Nationals || 3–12 || González (7–1) || Vólquez (3–8) || — || 20,868 || 31–38 || L1
|-style=background:#bfb;
| 70 || June 21 || Nationals || 2–1 || Barraclough (3–1) || Scherzer (8–5) || Ramos (10) || 22,659 || 32–38 || W1
|-style=background:#fbb;
| 71 || June 22 || Cubs || 1–11 || Arrieta (7–5) || Locke (0–3) || — || 23,472  || 32–39 || L1
|-style=background:#bfb;
| 72 || June 23 || Cubs || 2–0 || Ureña (6–2) || Lackey (5–8) || Ramos (11) || 24,684 || 33–39|| W1
|-style=background:#fbb;
| 73 || June 24 || Cubs || 3–5 || Lester (5–4) || Wittgren (1–1) || Davis (15) || 25,448 || 33–40 || L1
|-style=background:#bfb;
| 74 || June 25 || Cubs || 4–2 || Vólquez (4–8) || Montgomery (1–4) || Ramos (12) || 25,110 || 34–40 || W1
|-style=background:#bfb;
| 75 || June 27 || Mets || 6–3 || Barraclough (4–1) || Ramirez (0–1) || Ramos (13) || 20,804 || 35–40 || W2 
|-style=background:#fbb;
| 76 || June 28 || Mets || 0–8 || Matz (2-1) || Locke (0–4) || — || 18,743 || 35–41 || L1 
|-style=background:#fbb;
| 77 || June 29 || Mets || 3–6 ||  Lugo (3–1) || Ureña (6–3) || Reed (12) || 21,350 || 35–42 || L2
|-style=background:#fbb;
| 78 || June 30 ||@ Brewers || 2–3 || Torres (4–4) || Phelps (2–4) || Knabel (13)|| 35,549 || 35–43 || L3
|-

|-style=background:#fbb;
| 79 || July 1 ||@ Brewers || 4–8 || Davies (9–4) || Koehler (1–3) || — || 30,712 || 35–44 || L4
|-style=background:#bfb;
| 80 || July 2 ||@ Brewers || 10–3 || Straily (6–4) || Guerra (1–3) || — || 33,384  || 36–44 || W1
|-style=background:#fbb;
| 81 || July 3 ||@ Cardinals || 6–14 || Wainwright (9–5) || Locke (0–5) || — || 42,695 || 36–45 || L1
|-style=background:#bfb;
| 82 || July 4 ||@ Cardinals || 5–2 || Ureña (7–3) || Lynn (6–6) || Ramos (14) || 38,497 || 37–45 || W1
|-style=background:#bfb;
| 83 || July 5 ||@ Cardinals || 9–6 || McGowan (5–0) || Leake (6–7) || Ramos (15) || 40,204 || 38–45 || W2
|-style=background:#fbb;
| 84 || July 6 ||@ Cardinals || 3–4 || Wacha (6–3) || Koehler (1–4) || Oh (17) || 37,780 || 38–46 || L1 
|-style=background:#bfb;
| 85 || July 7 ||@ Giants || 6–1 || Straily (7–4) || Moore (3–9) || — || 41,510 || 39–46 || W1
|-style=background:#bfb;
| 86 || July 8 ||@ Giants || 5–4 || O'Grady (1–0) || Samardzija (4–10) || Ramos (16) || 41,480 || 40–46 || W2
|-style=background:#bfb;
| 87 || July 9 ||@ Giants || 10–8 (11) || Wittgren (2–1) || Kontos (0–3) || Ramos (17) || 41,516 || 41–46 || W3
|-style="text-align:center; background:#bbcaff;"
|colspan="10"|88th All-Star Game in Miami, Florida
|-style=background:#fbb;
| 88 || July 14 || Dodgers || 4–6 || Fields (5–0) || Ramos (2–4) || Jansen (22) || 21,858 || 41–47 || L1
|-style=background:#fbb;
| 89 || July 15 || Dodgers || 1–7 || Wood (11–0) || Ureña (7–4) || — || 22,609 || 41–48 || L2 
|-style=background:#fbb;
| 90 || July 16 || Dodgers || 2–3 || Hill (6–4) || O'Grady (1–1) || Jansen (23) || 22,119 || 41–49 || L3
|-style=background:#bfb;
| 91 || July 17 || Phillies || 6–5 (10) || Steckenrider (1–1)  || Leiter Jr. (1–2) || — || 17,146 || 42–49 || W1
|-style=background:#fbb;
| 92 || July 18 || Phillies || 2–5 || Neshek (3–2) || McGowan (5–1) || Neris (9) || 18,176 || 42–50 || L1
|-style=background:#fbb;
| 93 || July 19 || Phillies || 3–10 || Pivetta (3–5) || Straily (7–5) || — || 31,854 || 42–51 || L2
|-style=background:#bfb;
| 94 || July 21 ||@ Reds || 3–1 || Ureña (8–4)  || Bailey (2–4) || Ramos (18) || 21,851 || 43–51 || W1
|-style=background:#bfb;
| 95 || July 22 ||@ Reds || 5–4 || Wittgren (3–1) || Stephenson (0–3) || Ramos (19) || 24,099 || 44–51 || W2
|-style=background:#fbb;
| 96 || July 23 ||@ Reds || 3–6 || Romano (2–2) || Koehler (1–5) || Igiesias (17) || 20,526 || 44–52 || L1
|-style=background:#bfb;
| 97 || July 24 ||@ Rangers || 4–0 || Conley (3–3) || Perez (5–8) || — || 24,654 || 45–52 || W1
|-style=background:#fbb;
| 98 || July 25 ||@ Rangers || 4–10 || Hamels (5–1) || Straily (7–6) || — || 25,074 || 45–53 || L1
|-style=background:#bfb;
| 99 || July 26 ||@ Rangers || 22–10 || Ureña (9–4) || Darvish (6–9) || — || 26,471 || 46–53 || W1
|-style=background:#bfb;
| 100 || July 27 || Reds || 4–1 || O'Grady (2–1) || Stephenson (0–4) || Ramos (20) || 19,986 || 47–53 || W2
|-style=background:#bfb;
| 101 || July 28 || Reds || 7–4 || McGowan (6–1) || Peralta (3–2) || — || 17,440 || 48–53 || W3
|-style=background:#bfb;
| 102 || July 29 || Reds || 7–3 || Conley (4–3) || Adleman (5–9) || — || 20,297 || 49–53 || W4
|-style=background:#fbb;
| 103 || July 30 || Reds || 4–6 || Castillo (2–4) || Straily (7–7) || — || 19,947 || 49–54 || L1
|-style=background:#fbb;
| 104 || July 31 || Nationals || 0–1 || Gonzalez (9–5) || Ureña (9–5) || Doolittle (7) || 18,962 || 49–55 || L2
|-

|-style=background:#bfb;
| 105 || August 1 || Nationals || 7–6 || McGowan (7–1) || Albers (5–2) || Ziegler (1) || 17,742 || 50–55 || W1
|-style=background:#bfb;
| 106 || August 2 || Nationals || 7–0 || Worley (1–2) || Cole (1–1) || — || 17,890 || 51–55 || W2
|-style=background:#fbb;
| 107 || August 4 ||@ Braves || 3–5 || Dickey (7–7) || Conley (4–4) || Vizcaíno (4) || 35,914 || 51–56 || L1
|-style=background:#fbb;
| 108 || August 5 ||@ Braves || 2–7 || Foltynewicz (10–6) || Straily (7–8) || Vizcaíno (5) || 40,731 || 51–57 || L2
|-style=background:#bfb;
| 109 || August 6 ||@ Braves || 4–1 || Ureña (10–5) || Sims (0–2) || Ziegler (2) || 29,651 || 52–57 || W1
|-style=background:#fbb;
| 110 || August 7 ||@ Nationals || 2–3 || Kintzler (4–2) || García (0–2) || Doolittle (9) || 21,799 || 52–58 || L1
|-style=background:#bfb;
| 111 || August 8 ||@ Nationals || 7–3 || Worley (2–2) || Cole (1–2) || — || 25,406 || 53–58 || W1
|-style=background:#fbb;
| 112 || August 9 ||@ Nationals || 1–10 || González (10–5) || Conley (4–5) || — || 25,951 || 53–59 || L1
|-style=background:#fbb;
| 113 || August 10 ||@ Nationals || 2–3 || Madson (4–4) || Tazawa (1–2) || Doolittle (10)  || 23,904 || 53–60 || L2
|-style=background:#bfb;
| 114 || August 11 || Rockies || 6–3 || Tazawa (2–2) || McGee (0–2) || Ziegler (3) || 20,096 || 54–60 || W1
|-style=background:#bfb;
| 115 || August 12 || Rockies || 4–3 || Nicolino (1–1) || Hoffman (6–4) || Ziegler (4) || 20,399 || 55–60 || W2 
|-style=background:#bfb;
| 116 || August 13 || Rockies || 5–3 || Guerra (1–0) || Márquez (9–5) || Despaigne (1) || 20,769 || 56–60 || W3
|-style=background:#bfb;
| 117 || August 14 || Giants || 8–3 || Conley (5–5) || Blach (8–8) || — || 17,906 || 57–60 || W4
|-style=background:#fbb;
| 118 || August 15 || Giants || 4–9 || Bumgarner (3–5) || Tazawa (2–3) || — || 21,694 || 57–61 || L1
|-style=background:#bfb;
| 119 || August 16 || Giants || 8–1 || Ureña (11–5) || Cain (3–10) || — || 17,102 || 58–61 || W1
|-style=background:#bfb;
| 120 || August 18 ||@ Mets || 3–1 || Nicolino (2–1) || Flexen (2–2) || Ziegler (5) || 25,951 || 59–61 || W2 
|-style=background:#fbb;
| 121 || August 19 ||@ Mets || 1–8 || Montero (2–8) || Worley (2–3) || — || 30,171 || 59–62 || L1 
|-style=background:#bfb;
| 122 || August 20 ||@ Mets || 6–4 || Conley (6–5) || deGrom (13–7) || Ziegler (6) || 26,464 || 60–62 || W1
|-style=background:#bfb;
| 123 || August 22  (1) ||@ Phillies || 12–8 || Straily (8–8) || Nola (9–9) || — || N/A || 61–62 || W2
|-style=background:#bfb;
| 124 || August 22 (2) ||@ Phillies || 7–4 || Ureňa (12–5) || Pivetta (4–9) || Ziegler (7)|| 20,761 || 62–62 || W3
|-style=background:#fbb;
| 125 || August 23 ||@ Phillies || 0–8 || Leiter (2–3) || Nicolino (2–2) || — || 19,161 || 62–63 || L1
|-style=background:#bfb;
| 126 || August 24 ||@ Phillies || 9–8 || García (1–2) || García (1–4) || Ziegler (8) || 18,083 || 63–63 || W1
|-style=background:#bfb;
| 127 || August 25 || Padres || 8–6 || McGowan (8–1) || Yates (3–5) || Ziegler (9) || 22,489 || 64–63 || W2 
|-style=background:#bfb;
| 128 || August 26 || Padres || 2–1 (11) || Tazawa (3–3) || Torres (7–4) || — || 19,963 || 65–63 || W3
|-style=background:#bfb;
| 129 || August 27 || Padres || 6–2 || Barraclough (5–1) || Richard (6–13) || — || 23,275 || 66–63 || W4
|-style=background:#fbb;
| 130 || August 28 ||@ Nationals || 2–11 || Scherzer (13–5) || Ureňa (12–6) || — || 20,838 || 66–64 || L1
|-style=background:#fbb;
| 131 || August 29 ||@ Nationals || 3–8 || Jackson (5–3) || Worley (2–4) || — || 25,924 || 66–65 || L2
|-style=background:#fbb;
| 132 || August 30 ||@ Nationals || 0–4 || Strasburg (11–4) || Conley (6–6) || — || 25,019 || 66–66 || L3
|-style=background:#fbb;
| 133 || August 31 || Phillies || 2–3 || Lively (2–5) || Despaigne (0–2) || Neris (17) || 17,013 || 66–67 || L4
|-

|-style=background:#fbb;
| 134 || September 1 || Phillies || 1–2 || Nicasio (3–5) || Ziegler (1–3) || Neris (18) || 17,998 || 66–68 || L5
|-style=background:#bfb;
| 135 || September 2 || Phillies || 10–9 || Straily (9–8) || Nola (10–10) || Steckenrider (1) || 18,262 || 67–68 || W1
|-style=background:#fbb;
| 136 || September 3 || Phillies || 1–3 (12) || Morgan (3–1) || Tazawa (3–4) || Neris (19) || 19,404 || 67–69 || L1
|-style=background:#fbb;
| 137 || September 4 || Nationals || 2–7 || Cole (2–4) || Conley (6–7) || — || 17,349 || 67–70 || L2
|-style=background:#fbb;
| 138 || September 5 || Nationals || 1–2 || Strasburg (12–4) || Despaigne (0–3) || Doolittle (18) || 15,364 || 67–71  || L3
|-style=background:#fbb;
| 139 || September 6 || Nationals || 1–8 || González (14–6) || Peters (0–1) || — || 14,390 || 67–72 || L4
|-style=background:#fbb;
| 140 || September 7 ||@ Braves || 5–6 || Brothers (3–3) || Ziegler (1–4) || — || 23,561 || 67–73 || L5
|-style=background:#bfb;
| 141 || September 8 ||@ Braves || 7–1 || Ureňa (13–6) || Foltynewicz (10–12) || — || 30,056 || 68–73 || W1
|-style=background:#fbb;
| 142 || September 9 ||@ Braves || 5–6 || Vizcaíno (4–3) || Barraclough (5–2) || — || 34,403 || 68–74 || L1
|-style=background:#fbb;
| 143 || September 10 ||@ Braves || 8–10 (11) || Vizcaíno (5–3) || Worley (2–5) || — || 34,974 || 68–75 || L2
|-style=background:#fbb;
| 144 || September 12 ||@ Phillies || 8–9 (15) || Ramos (2–7) || Guerra (1–1) || — || 16,439 || 68–76 || L3
|-style=background:#fbb;
| 145 || September 13 ||@ Phillies || 1–8 || Nola (11–10) || Straily (9–9) || — || 16,745 || 68–77 || L4
|-style=background:#fbb;
| 146 || September 14 ||@ Phillies || 0–10 || Thompson (2–2) || Worley (2–6) || — || 16,302 || 68–78 || L5
|-style=background:#fbb;
| 147 || September 15 || Brewers || 2–10 || Hughes (4–3) || Ellington (0–1) || — || 19,369 || 68–79 || L6
|-style=background:#bfb;
| 148 || September 16 || Brewers || 7–4 || Conley (7–7) || Davies (17–9) || — || 25,079 || 69–79 || W1
|-style=background:#fbb;
| 149 || September 17 || Brewers|| 3–10 || Woodruff (2–2) || Peters (0–2) || — || 24,535 || 69–80 || L1
|-style=background:#bfb;
| 150 || September 18 || Mets || 13–1 || Straily (10–9) || Harvey (5–6) || Worley (1) || 16,385 || 70–80 || W1
|-style=background:#bfb;
| 151 || September 19 || Mets || 5–4 (10)|| Barraclough (6–2) || Sewald (0–6) || — || 16,405 || 71–80 || W2
|-style=background:#bfb;
| 152 || September 20 || Mets || 9–2 || Ureňa (14–6) || Montero (5–11) || — || 16,033 || 72–80 || W3
|-style=background:#fbb;
| 153 || September 22 || @ D-backs || 11–13 || Hoover (2–1) || McGowan (8–2) || Rodney (38) || 34,588 || 72–81 || L1
|-style=background:#bfb;
| 154 || September 23 || @ D-backs || 12–6 || Ellington (1–1) || Walker (9–9) || — || 39,259 || 73–81 || W1
|-style=background:#fbb;
| 155 || September 24 || @ D-backs || 2–3 || Rodney (5–4) || Nicolino (2–3) || — || 31,539 || 73–82 || L1
|-style=background:#bfb;
| 156 || September 25 ||@ Rockies || 5–4 || Despaigne (1–3) || Chatwood (8–14) || Barraclough (1) || 24,685 || 74–82 || W1
|-style=background:#fbb;
| 157 || September 26 ||@ Rockies || 0–6 || Anderson (6–6) || Urena (14–7) || — || 30,409 || 74–83 || L1
|-style=background:#fbb;
| 158 || September 27 ||@ Rockies || 9–15 || Gray (10–4) || Conley (7–8) || — || 27,497 || 74–84 || L2
|-style=background:#bfb;
| 159 || September 28 || Braves || 7–1 || Peters (1–2) || Teherán (11–13) || — || 17,305 || 75–84 || W1
|-style=background:#bfb;
| 160 || September 29 || Braves || 6–5 || Conley (8–8) || Winker (0–1) || Ziegler (10) || 19,527 || 76–84 || W2
|-style=background:#bfb;
| 161 || September 30 || Braves || 10–2 || Despaigne (2–3) || Sims (3–6) || — || 25,264 || 77–84 || W3 
|-style=background:#fbb;
| 162 || October 1 || Braves || 5–8 || Winkler (1–1) || Tazawa (3–5) || Vizcaíno (14) || 25,222 || 77–85 || L1  
|-

|- style="text-align:center;"
| Legend:       = Win       = Loss       = PostponementBold = Marlins team member

Roster

Statistics

Batting

Players in bold are on the MLB active roster as of the 2022 season.

Note: G = Games played; AB = At bats; R = Runs; H = Hits; 2B = Doubles; 3B = Triples; HR = Home runs; RBI = Runs batted in; SB = Stolen bases; BB = Walks; K = Strikeouts; Avg. = Batting average; OBP = On-base percentage; SLG = Slugging percentage; TB = Total bases

Pitching
Players in bold are on the MLB active roster as of the 2022 season.

Note: W = Wins; L = Losses; ERA = Earned run average; G = Games pitched; GS = Games started; SV = Saves; IP = Innings pitched; H = Hits allowed; R = Runs allowed; ER = Earned runs allowed; BB = Walks allowed; K = Strikeouts

Farm system

See also

 50 home run club
 List of Major League Baseball career putouts as a right fielder leaders
 List of Major League Baseball no-hitters

References

External links
2017 Miami Marlins season at Baseball Reference

Miami Marlins season
Miami Marlins
Miami Marlins seasons